The properties on this List of contributing properties (Sycamore Historic District) are part of the National Register of Historic Places. They joined the Register when the Sycamore Historic District, in Sycamore, Illinois, was designated in 1978.

Churches
 First Baptist Church (Sycamore, Illinois)
 St. Mary's Roman Catholic Church (Sycamore, Illinois)
 St. Peter's Episcopal Church (Sycamore, Illinois)
 Old Congregational Church (Sycamore, Illinois)

Demolished structures
 116 S. Somonauk St.
 503 S. Somonauk St.
 Evangelical Lutheran Church of St. John
 United Methodist Church (Sycamore, Illinois)

Government
 Civil War Memorial (Sycamore, Illinois)
 DeKalb County Courthouse (Illinois)
 Old East School
 Sycamore Public Library
 U.S. Post Office (Sycamore, Illinois)

Houses
 124 W. Ottawa
 134 W. Ottawa
 202 S. Maple
 312 S. Somonauk St.
 314 S. Main St.
 328 S. Somonauk St.
 413 S. Somonauk St.
 418 W. High St.
 437 S. Somonauk St.
 512 S. Main St.
 Abram Ellwood House
 Byers-Faissler House
 Captain R.A. Smith House
 Carlos Lattin House
 Chappell-Whittemore House
 Charles A. Bishop House
 Charles Kellum House
 Charles O. Boynton House
 Chauncey Ellwood House
 David DeGraff House
 David Syme House
 D. B. James House
 Dr. Clark House
 Dr. Orlando M. Bryan House
 Dr. Olin H. Smith House
 Elmore Cooper House
 Esther Mae Nesbitt House
 Floyd E. Brower House
 Frederick B. Townsend House
 General Daniel Dustin House
 George P. Wild House
 George S. Robinson-Ellzey Young House
 Henry Garbutt House
 Hosea Willard House
 James Ellwood House
 J.H Rogers House
 J.H. Rogers/Bettis House
 Peter Johnsen Rooming House
 Row houses (Sycamore, Illinois)
 Stephens House
 Universalist Church/Arthur Stark House
 Wally Thurow House
 William McAllister House
 William Robinson House (Sycamore, Illinois)

Other structures
 156 W. State St.
 Central Block (Sycamore, Illinois)
 Charles O. Boyton Carriage House
 Citizens National Bank Building
 Court Building (Sycamore, Illinois)
 Daniel Pierce Building
 Frederick Townsend Garage
 George's Block
 National Bank & Trust Co.
 Old Sycamore Hospital
 State Street Theatre
 Stratford Inn
 Townsend Building (Sycamore, Illinois)
 Waterman Block